EPS Elektrokosmet is a Serbian state-owned transmission system operator company for electricity with the headquarters in Pristina, Kosovo. It is specialized in the transmission of electrical power.

History
EPS Elektrokosmet was founded by Elektroprivreda Srbije (EPS) on 27 December 1989.

Following the Kosovo War and NATO bombing of Yugoslavia in 1999, the UNMIK administration was established in Kosovo on 1 July 1999, and Elektroprivreda Srbije lost its access to the local coal mines and power plants, including Kosovo A and Kosovo B power plants, which were under jurisdiction of EPS Elektrokosmet.

Since then, government-owned Elektroprivreda Srbija by political decision continued to pay off earnings to all of Kosovo-based EPS companies, including EPS Elektrokosmet employees (the other two EPS companies based on Kosovo are EPS Surface Mining Kosovo and EPS TPP Kosovo). However, all these employees are not working in Kosovo-based power plants, and are only occasionally and indirectly employed by EPS throughout the rest of Serbia. As of May 2009, there was a total of around 7,000 such employees which were working only on paper and receive regular earnings. As of June 2017, that number was cut to 4,539 employees.

On 24 June 2022, the Energy Regulatory Office gave Elektosever the right to distribute electricity to the four municipalities in North Kosovo, which means Elektosever replaces EPS Elektrokosmet.

See also
 Elektroprivreda Srbije
 EPS Surface Mining Kosovo
 EPS TPP Kosovo
 Electrical energy in Kosovo

Notes

References

External links
 Official website

Elektroprivreda Srbije
Electric power companies of Serbia
Electric power transmission system operators in Serbia
Government-owned companies of Serbia
Energy companies established in 1989
Serbian companies established in 1989